On Probation is a 1924 American silent drama film directed by Charles Hutchison and starring Edith Thornton, Robert Ellis, and Joseph Kilgour.

Plot
As described in a 1924 film magazine review:

Cast

References

External links

1924 drama films
1920s English-language films
American silent feature films
Silent American drama films
American black-and-white films
Films directed by Charles Hutchison
1920s American films